The Stony Brook Reservation Parkways are a group of historic parkways in Boston and Dedham, Massachusetts.  They provide access to and within the Stony Brook Reservation, a Massachusetts state park.  The roadways and the park are administered by the Massachusetts Department of Conservation and Recreation, a successor to the Metropolitan District Commission, which oversaw their construction.  The roads consist of the Dedham, Enneking, and Turtle Pond Parkways and West Boundary Road. Two roads within the park, Smithfield Road and Reservation Road, are listed as non-contributing properties. The park roads were built between 1894 and 1956, and were listed on the National Register of Historic Places in 2006.

West Boundary Road
When it was built in 1928, West Boundary Road skirted the western boundary of the reservation, running from Washington Street in the north to Turtle Pond Parkway in the south.  This route is now interrupted by a housing development, and the southern end of the roadway ends after  at Georgetowne Drive.  Most of the rest of its former alignment has been converted to a wide hiking path.

Dedham Parkway
The reservation's three main parkways meet at a junction within the park known as the Robert Bleakie Intersection, located in the southern part of the park.  The Dedham Parkway, a two-lane road, extends southwest from this junction, exiting the park soon afterward.  It passes a junction with Georgetowne Drive, and then with Alwin Street, before crossing into Dedham and reaching its southern terminus, a junction with Harding Terrace (the cross street), and Dedham Boulevard (its southerly continuation).  The parkway was built in stages, in 1900 and 1912.

Turtle Pond Parkway
Turtle Pond Parkway was built in 1897, and extends southeast from the Bleakie Intersection.   It is, like the Dedham Parkway, a two-lane road. It eventually skirts the southwestern edge of the reservation, passing through an intersection with Smithfield Road and Alwin Street.  It continues roughly southward, passing the southern tip of the reservation before reaching Boston's Mill Pond Reservation, and its own terminus at a junction with River Street.  River Street provides a connection (on the far side of Mill Pond Reservation) to the Neponset Valley Parkway.

Enneking Parkway
The Enneking Parkway, built in 1897, extends north and east from the Bleakie Intersection.  The northern leg extends through much of the reservation, eventually reaching its northern terminus with Washington Street and the West Roxbury Parkway, which continues northward.  The eastern leg reaches a junction with West Smithfield Road, before turning into East Boundary Road near the Smith Pond Playground.

See also
National Register of Historic Places listings in Norfolk County, Massachusetts
National Register of Historic Places listings in southern Boston, Massachusetts

References

Roads on the National Register of Historic Places in Massachusetts
Parkways in Massachusetts
Transportation in Norfolk County, Massachusetts
Streets in Boston
Historic trails and roads in Dedham, Massachusetts
National Register of Historic Places in Norfolk County, Massachusetts
National Register of Historic Places in Boston
Historic districts on the National Register of Historic Places in Massachusetts
Parks on the National Register of Historic Places in Massachusetts